Hans Lagerwall (1 March 1941 – 5 October 2022) was a Swedish épée and foil fencer. He competed at the 1960 and 1964 Summer Olympics. Lagerwall died on 5 October 2022, at the age of 81.

References

External links
 

1941 births
2022 deaths
Swedish male foil fencers
Swedish male épée fencers
Olympic fencers of Sweden
Fencers at the 1960 Summer Olympics
Fencers at the 1964 Summer Olympics
Sportspeople from Gothenburg
20th-century Swedish people